Kwaaiman Pass (English: Angry Man) is situated in the Eastern Cape province of South Africa, on the road between Cala, Eastern Cape and Tsomo.

Mountain passes of the Eastern Cape